Polyushko-polye is a Soviet Russian-language song. Polye means "field" in Russian, "polyushko" is a diminutive/hypocoristic form for "polye". It is also known as Meadowlands, Song of the Plains, Cavalry of the Steppes or Oh Fields, My Fields in English.

Soviet arrangements 

The music was composed by Lev Knipper, with lyrics by Viktor Gusev in 1933. The song was part of the symphony with chorus (lyrics by Gusev) "A Poem about a Komsomol Soldier" (Поэма о бойце-комсомольце) composed in 1934. The original lyrics are sung from the perspective of a Red Army recruit, who proudly leaves his home to keep watch against his homeland's enemies.

The song was covered many times by many artists in the Soviet Union, including a well-known rock version recorded by Poyushchiye Gitary, released c. 1967. The song has been regularly performed and recorded by the Alexandrov Ensemble, and it is listed in the Alexandrov Ensemble discography, best known as the Red Army Choir.

Full version at London 1945 Youth Congress 
At the opening of the London 1945 Youth Congress, the full version of Polyushko-polye was performed by a choir of 6,000 members. The music for this performance was composed by musician L. A. Stokovsky, based on the original music of L. Knipper.

Other arrangements 
Paul Robeson recorded an English translation of the song in 1942 under the title "Song of the Plains". It was released on his Columbia Recordings album Songs of Free Men.

The Swedish jazz pianist Jan Johansson recorded a version of the song in 1967 under the title "Stepp, min stepp" (steppe, my steppe) on the album Jazz på ryska (Jazz in Russian).

The American rock band Jefferson Airplane had an instrumental version of the song, titled "Meadowlands", on their album Volunteers (1969).

An arrangement by Phillip Bimstein titled "Meadowlands", recorded by his band Phil 'N' the Blanks and released on the 1982 album Lands and Peoples.

An instrumental version of the song was recorded by James Last and appears in his James Last - In Russia album.

Outside Russia, several arrangements of the tune are known under the title "The Cossack Patrol", particularly a version by Ivan Rebroff.

Cultural influence 

Michael Palin notably performed the song with the choir of the Russian Pacific Fleet in the television series Full Circle with Michael Palin.

The song is the third one heard at the beginning of Cast Away, an American movie starring Tom Hanks, right after Elvis Presley's "Heartbreak Hotel" and "All Shook Up".

The song is used throughout the movie "REDS" (1981), the epic historical drama about American journalist John Reed who chronicled the October Revolution in Russia in 1917.

The opening credits of the 1966 Cold War comedy film The Russians Are Coming, the Russians Are Coming uses this song.

The song plays during a scene taking place at the Greek Parliament for Kremlin, in the Nikos Perakis film Loufa & Parallagi (1984).

The anime Girls und Panzer uses "Polyushko-polye" along with "Katyusha" as the theme songs for the fictional "Pravda Girls High School".

High school teacher Pedersen's pupils sing the song in the class room, and the melody is used throughout the film Comrade Pedersen.

The melody is the basis for Ervin And Andrea Litkei’s song "Hold Me Forever", which is featured in the credits for season 4, episode 6 of What We Do in the Shadows (TV series).

It is used in the opening scene of the TV series Kleo, and a remix version by Modeselektor appears in the closing credits of the season 1 final episode.

Chabad-Lubavitch Chasidim created a nigun using the tune and sing it to the words "Der Rebbe Zal Zayn Gezunt" (the Rebbe will be healthy).

The melody of the tune is used in the "yo yo" chorus in "Surfin' U.S.S.R." by Ray Stevens from his 1987 album He Thinks He's Ray Stevens.

Notes

External links

Russian songs
Soviet songs
1934 songs